Art Meets Matter is a design collective exploring the relationship between cultural iconography and objects and materials. 

Created by Royal College of Art graduate Tony Davis the company has explored iconic sources as diverse at the London Underground Diagram or Tube map, London's A-Z Map and the original book cover designs of Penguin Paperbacks from the 1930s. They have also pioneered a philosophy of eco-friendly design and recycling. 

One of their major design projects was to link the iconography and original design of the Penguin Books from the 1930s to prosaic objects like mugs and deckchairs. Art Meets Matter explores the relationship between use and context. For example, they create a utilitarian object like a deckchair which visually references an original Penguin Book but is also relevant to the use of the object when reading. 

They are also publisher of Bookchase, the book-based board game.

References
 Picture perfect decor, by Nicole Swengley, The Independent, published 19 May 2004. 
 London Underground posted by MocoLoco, published 23 November 2005. https://web.archive.org/web/20070915034703/http://mocoloco.com/archives/001760.php
 Protect it or Forget it, by Dids Macdonald of ACID, published 17 November 2005. Page 8. https://web.archive.org/web/20060517170335/http://www.acid.uk.com/pdf/newsletter/ACIDspring2006.pdf
 Most 'On Trend' Award, by Pulse, 2006. https://web.archive.org/web/20070813074648/http://www.pulse-london.com/Pulse07/Main.nsf/nfpages/visitors_MZIE-6XXE5U
 Couture Interiors - Living with Fashion, by Marnie Fogg, Laurence King, published 20 September 2007. p41, p139, p220. https://www.amazon.com/gp/reader/1856695352/ref=sib_dp_pop_idx/103-7365608-0437466?ie=UTF8&p=S06A#reader-link
The Ten Best Eco-designs, by Rebecca Armstrong, The Independent, published 11 July 2006. http://findarticles.com/p/articles/mi_qn4158/is_20060711/ai_n16523984
 Eco Fabulous 4Homes Magazine, published September 2006. http://www.channel4.com/4homes/magazine/sept_06/eco_fabulous-4.html

External links
 Art Meets Matter web site

Companies established in 2002
2002 establishments in the United Kingdom